Religion in Circassia refers to religious presence in historical Circassia and modern-day Adygea, Kabardino-Balkaria, Krasnodar Krai and Karachai-Cherkessia. The majority of ethnic Circassians today are Muslim while a minority retain Orthodox Christian or pagan beliefs.

History 
Circassia gradually went through following various religions: Paganism, Christianity, and then Islam.

Paganism 

The ancient beliefs of the Circassians were based on animism and magic, within the framework of the customary rules of Xabze. Although the main belief was Monistic-Monotheistic, they prayed using water, fire, plants, forests, rocks, thunder and lightning. They performed their acts of worship accompanied by dance and music in the sacred groves used as temples. An old priest led the ceremony, accompanied by songs of prayer, consisting of meaningless words and supplications. Thus, it was aimed to protect the newborn babies from diseases and the evil eye. Another important aspect was ancestors and honor. Therefore, the goal of man's earthly existence is the perfection of the soul, which corresponds to the maintenance of honour, manifestation of compassion, gratuitous help, which, along with valour, and bravery of a warrior, enables the human soul to join the soul of the ancestors with a clear conscience.

Judaism 
Some Circassian tribes chose Judaism in the past as a result of the settlement of approximately 20 thousand Jews in the 8th century Circassia, along with the relations established with the Turkic-Jewish Khazar Khaganate. Although Judaism in Circassia eventually assimilated into Christianity and Islam.

Christianity 
It is the tradition of the early church that Christianity made its first appearance in Circassia in the 1st century AD via the travels and preaching of the Apostle Andrew, but recorded history suggests that, as a result of Greek and Byzantine influence, Christianity first spread throughout Circassia between the 3rd and 5th centuries AD. The spread of the Catholic faith was only possible with the Latin Conquest of Constantinople by the crusaders and the establishment of the Latin state. The Catholic religion was adopted by the Circassians following Farzakht, a distinguished figure who greatly contributed to the spread of this religion in his country. The pope sent him a letter in 1333 thanking him for his effort, as an indication of his gratitude. For Circassians, the most important and attractive personality in all Christian teachings was the personality of St. George. They saw in him the embodiment of all the virtues respected in the Caucasus. His name in Circassian is Awushidjer or Dawushdjerdjiy.

Christianity in Circassia experienced its final collapse in the 18th century when the majority of Circassians were converted to Islam. The ex-priests joined the Circassian nobility and were given the name "shogene" (teacher) which over time became a surname. Many Circassian families are descended from these priests, some of Greek origin and some of Roman.

Islam 
A small Muslim community in Circassia has always existed since the Middle Ages, but widespread Islamization occurred after 1717. Travelling Sufi preachers and the increasing threat of an invasion from Russia helped expedite the process of the Islamization of Circassia. Circassian scholars educated in the Ottoman Empire boosted the spread of Islam. Circassian elders saw some elements in Islamic tradition as the influences of foreign culture and rejected them, and while Circassians were Sunni Muslims officially, most Circassians were non-denominational and only accepted the Sunni practices after being exiled.

Contemporary era

Adygea 
According to a 2012 survey which interviewed 56,900 people, 35.4% of the population of Adygea adheres to the Russian Orthodox Church, 12.6% to Islam, 3% are unaffiliated Christians and 1% are Orthodox Christian believers who don't belong to church or are members of other Orthodox churches. In addition, 30% of the population declares to be "spiritual but not religious", 9% is atheist, and 8.6% follows other religions or did not answer to the question.

Kabardino-Balkaria 
According to a 2012 survey which interviewed 56,900 people, 70.8% of the population of Kabardino-Balkaria adheres to Islam, 11.6% to the Russian Orthodox Church, 1.8% to Circassian paganism and other indigenous faiths, 3.8% are unaffiliated generic Christians. In addition, 12% of the population declares to be "spiritual but not religious", 5.6% is Atheist or follows other religions including Jehovah's Witnesses.

Krasnodar Krai 
According to a 2012 survey 52.2% of the population of Krasnodar Krai adheres to the Russian Orthodox Church, 3% are unaffiliated generic Christians, 1% are either Orthodox Christian believers who don't belong to church or members of non-Russian Orthodox churches, and 1% are Muslims. In addition, 22% of the population declares to be "spiritual but not religious", 13% is atheist, and 7.8% follows other religions or did not give an answer to the question.

Karachay-Cherkessia 
According to a 2012 survey which interviewed 56,900 people, 64% of the population of Karachay-Cherkessia adheres to Islam, 13% to the Russian Orthodox Church, 2% to the Karachay and Circassian native faith, 2% are unaffiliated Christians, unchurched Orthodox Christian believers or members of non-Russian Orthodox churches. In addition, 10% of the population declares to be 

"spiritual but not religious", 3% are atheist, and 6% are other/undeclared.

References 

Islam in Russia
Christianity in Russia
Judaism in Russia